Alfred "Ali" Neumann (15 December 1909 –  8 January 2001) was an East German politician. He was a member of the Politburo of the Central Committee of the Socialist Unity Party of Germany, and for a short time, he was East German Minister of Materials Management.

Life
Neumann was born in Berlin-Schöneberg and completed training as a joiner. In 1919, he joined the worker's sport club "Fichte" ("Fir" or "Spruce"), which in 1928 became a member of the "Fighting Community for Red Sport Unity" ("Kampfgemeinschaft für Rote Sporteinheit"; KG). Neumann became a member of the Communist Party of Germany (KPD) in 1929, and in 1930, a member of the KG state leadership.

Second World War
In 1933-1934 he worked together with Karl Maron illegally – for Hitler had come to power by now – for the KG. In 1934, he emigrated through Sweden and Finland to the USSR, where he worked as a sport teacher. In 1938, he was expelled from the Soviet Union as he had no Soviet citizenship, and he went to Spain where he participated in the Spanish Civil War as a member of the International Brigades. In 1939, he was arrested in France and interned, in 1941, he was handed over to the Gestapo, and in 1942 he was sentenced by the Volksgerichtshof to eight years at hard labour in a Zuchthaus for high treason. In February 1945, he was transferred from Brandenburg-Görden Prison to the Dirlewanger SS penal battalion, from which he succeeded in escaping. He became a Soviet prisoner of war, however, and stayed until 1947 in several prison camps.

East Germany
After his return to Germany, he joined the Socialist Unity Party ("Sozialistische Einheitspartei Deutschlands"; SED) and was an administrative staffer and an SED functionary at the district level in Berlin. In 1949, he became Secretary for Propaganda for the SED Berlin state leadership, from 1951 to 1953, he was East Berlin's acting mayor, and from 1953 to 1957, succeeding Hans Jendretzky, he was First Secretary of the Berlin SED district leadership.

From 1949, Neumann was a representative in the Volkskammer, from 1954 a member of the Central Committee and candidate, and from February 1958 a member of the SED Central Committee's Politburo. From 1957 to 1961, he was SED Central Committee Secretary, from 1961 to 1965 chairman of the People's Economic Council (Volkswirtschaftsrat), and from 1965 to 1968 Minister of Materials Management. From 1962, he was a member of the Presidium of the Council of Ministers, and in 1968 he was one of the first two acting chairmen of the Council of Ministers.

Neumann played an important role in the initiation and implementation of the New Economic System ("Neues Ökonomisches System"; NÖS). In the wake of  Erich Honecker's removal of Walter Ulbricht in 1971, Neumann, as the only important Politburo member from that time, refused to go along with underwriting a secret request to the Soviet leadership for Ulbricht's redemption, since he was on Ulbricht's side on content and conceptual issues. Erich Honecker would never forget this. Neumann was until the end an uncomfortable antagonist to Honecker, but this was never used in public against him.

Downfall
In 1989, in East Germany's dying days, Neumann went back to join the Council of Ministers and was excluded from the Politburo. He was also excluded from the SED/PDS in 1990. From 1992 he faced accusations of "manslaughter and bodily harm on the inter-German border" for his membership in the East German National Defence Council ("Nationaler Verteidigungsrat der DDR"). The 23rd Penal Chamber of the Berlin State Court, however, stayed proceedings in 1999 without ever arranging a trial.

Neumann received in 1956 and 1964 the Fatherland Order of Merit and in 1984 the Order of Karl Marx.

Literature 
 "Arbeit für den Sozialismus", selected speeches, Berlin 1979
 "Die DDR stärken - den Frieden sichern", selected speeches, Berlin 1984
S. Prokop: "Poltergeist im Politbüro. S. Prokop im Gespräch mit Alfred Neumann", Frankfurt an der Oder 1996

External links

 

1909 births
2001 deaths
Politicians from Berlin
Communist Party of Germany politicians
Members of the Politburo of the Central Committee of the Socialist Unity Party of Germany
Government ministers of East Germany
Members of the 1st Volkskammer
Members of the 2nd Volkskammer
Members of the 3rd Volkskammer
Members of the 4th Volkskammer
Members of the 5th Volkskammer
Members of the 6th Volkskammer
Members of the 7th Volkskammer
Members of the 8th Volkskammer
Members of the 9th Volkskammer
Communists in the German Resistance
People convicted of treason against Germany
German people of the Spanish Civil War
International Brigades personnel
Waffen-SS personnel
German prisoners of war in World War II held by the Soviet Union
Recipients of the Patriotic Order of Merit in gold
Recipients of the Banner of Labor